Shule County as the official romanized name, also transliterated from Uyghur as Kaxgar Yengixahar County or shorten as Yengixahar County, is a county situated in the Xinjiang Uyghur Autonomous Region and is under the administrative jurisdiction of the Kashgar Prefecture. It is located to the south of Kashgar City. In Ancient times, the Shule area was once the home to a Xiyu oasis civilisation, the Shule Kingdom.

History
On May 31, 2012, Sidik Kurban was sentenced by Shule County Intermediate People’s Court to fifteen years in jail and five years deprivation of political rights for 'inciting ethnic separatism' related to involvement in 'illegal religious activities'. For a decade, he had overseen home-based religious schools for eighty-six students.

Administrative divisions

Towns ( / )
Yengisheher Town (Shule;  /), Hanerik (Hannanlike;  / ), Yapchan (Yafuquan;  / )
	
Townships ( / )
Barin Township (Baren;  / ), Yanduma Township (Yandaman;  / ), Yamanyar Township (Yamanya;  / ), Baghchi Township (Baheqi;  / ), Tazghun Township (Tazihong;  / ), Yengierik Township (Ying'erlike;  / ), Kumusherik Township (Kumuxilike;  / ), Tagharchi Township (Taga'erqi;  / ), Ermudun Township (Ai'ermudong;  / ), Aral Township (Alali;  / ), Harap Township (Alilafu;  / ), Yengiawat Township (Ying'awati;  / )

Others
Linchang (林场)| Liangzhong Farm (良种场) | Zhongchu Farm (种畜场) | Yuanyi Fields (园艺场) | Canzhong Farm (蚕种场) | Shuichan Farm (水产场) | Fengchang 蜂场 | XPCC 41 base (兵团41团)

Economy
, there was about 85,400 acres (555,448 mu) of cultivated land in Shule.

Demographics

As of 2015, 350,301 of the 377,029 residents of the county were Uyghur, 25,709 were Han Chinese and 1,019 were from other ethnic groups.

As of 1999, 93% of the population of Yengixahar (Shule) County was Uyghur and 6.7% of the population was Han Chinese.

Transportation
Shule is served by China National Highway 315 and the Kashgar-Hotan Railway.

Notable persons
 Almikhan Seyit / Alimihan Seiti ( / ) , claimed to have died at 132 years old

Historical maps
Maps including Shule:

Notes

References

County-level divisions of Xinjiang
Kashgar Prefecture